The Presidential Range in the White Mountains of New Hampshire consist of a series of mountains whose maximum elevation reaches  and represent some of the highest mountains in the United States east of the Mississippi River. Fatalities in this area are dominated by those that occur on Mount Washington, the highest peak in the range. It is notorious for its unpredictable and inclement weather, making it one of the deadliest mountains in the continental United States. Due to its unique location relative to other geographic features, it holds the world record for highest recorded surface wind speed not within a tropical cyclone. The New Hampshire Fish and Game Department conducts an average of 200 rescues a year for hikers in need of assistance. Mt. Washington has had more fatalities per vertical foot than any other mountain in the world.

Fatalities 
The following table lists all known fatalities and missing persons within the Presidential Range. Many fatalities occur during spring, autumn and winter, particularly when the weather in the surrounding lower elevations is slightly above average for the season.

Notes

References 

Mountain ranges of New Hampshire
Death in the United States-related lists
Death in New Hampshire
History of New Hampshire
New Hampshire-related lists